The Washington Capitals are a professional ice hockey team based in Washington, D.C. The team is a member of the Metropolitan Division of the Eastern Conference of the National Hockey League (NHL). The Capitals played at the Capital Centre from their inaugural season in 1974 to 1997, when they moved to the MCI Center, now known as the Capital One Arena. In 44 completed seasons, the Capitals have qualified for the Stanley Cup playoffs 29 times, making two Stanley Cup Finals appearances during the 1997–98 and 2017–18 seasons, winning the latter.

The Capitals were founded in 1974 as an expansion team in the Prince of Wales Conference. The team had an 8–67–5 record and lost 37 straight road games in their inaugural season. The Capitals made their first playoffs in the 1982–83 season and qualified for the playoffs for the following 13 seasons in a row. The Capitals won the Eastern Conference during their 1997–98 season but were swept by the Detroit Red Wings in the 1998 Stanley Cup Finals.

After reaching the Finals, the Capitals were assigned to the Southeast Division, in which they remained in for 15 years, until a NHL division realignment brought them into the newly formed Metropolitan Division in 2013. Through these times, the Capitals won three Presidents' Trophies in the 2009–10, 2015–16 and 2016–17 seasons, before finally winning their first Stanley Cup in the 2017–18 season after 42 seasons (not counting the cancelled 2004–05 season).

Table key

Year by year

Notes
 In 1992, the NHL expanded the season to 84 games, and each team played two games at a neutral site. After the 1995 lockout, the neutral site games were eliminated, and the season was reduced to 82 games.
 The NHL realigned into Eastern and Western conferences prior to the 1993–94 season. Washington was placed in the Atlantic Division of the Eastern Conference.
 The season was shortened to 48 games because of the 1994–95 NHL lockout.
 Beginning with the 1999–00 season, teams received one point for losing a regular season game in overtime.
 The season was canceled because of the 2004–05 NHL lockout.
 Before the 2005–06 season, the NHL instituted a penalty shootout for regular season games that remained tied after a five-minute overtime period, which prevented ties.
 The NHL added 4 expansion teams prior to the 1998–99 season and split the Eastern Conference into three divisions: Northeast, Atlantic, and Southeast. Washington was moved into the new Southeast division.
 The season was shortened to 48 games because of the 2012–13 NHL lockout.
 The NHL realigned prior to the 2013–14 season. Washington was placed in the Metropolitan Division of the Eastern Conference.
 The 2019-20 NHL season was suspended on March 12, 2020 because of the COVID-19 pandemic. The top 24 teams in the league qualified for the playoffs.
  The 2020–21 NHL season was shortened to 56 games because of the COVID-19 pandemic.

References

External links 
 Washington Capitals official website

Washington Capitals
seasons
Events in Washington, D.C.